Hélène Campbell (born April 18, 1991) is a woman from Ottawa who has raised great awareness for organ donations, largely through documenting her own need for new lungs via social media and by attracting support from celebrities including Justin Bieber and Ellen DeGeneres.

Hélène's story

Campbell had been diagnosed with asthma at the age of 14. In summer 2011, she could not keep up with friends and after almost collapsing during hiking, she went to see her family doctor. In October 2011, she was diagnosed with advanced idiopathic pulmonary fibrosis and was told she needed a double lung transplant. In September 2011, Hélène's lungs function was only 26% and in October it went down to 24%. Since lung transplants were not done in Ottawa, she had to move to Toronto in January to be placed on the transplant waiting list.

In late March, Hélène's condition was decaying quickly and her lung function was only 7%. On April 4, she had serious difficulty breathing and was admitted to the Toronto General Hospital. Hélène's lung function was a 6%, and was getting smaller by the minute. Her condition was grave enough that she was almost taken off the list - she was considered a "high risk patient". On April 6, Hélène underwent a successful double lung transplant at the Toronto General Hospital.

Since then, she has been working with organizations all over the world to bring awareness to Organ Donation, Giving blood, and bone marrow donation. She is a motivational speaker and is passionate about sharing her experiences with anyone.

The Hélène Effect

In January 2012, she started the online campaign #BeAnOrganDonor on Twitter to get the attention of Canadian popstar Justin Bieber. After Bieber retweeted her campaign, over 2,000 people in Ontario alone registered to be organ donors.

In March, Campbell was on The Ellen DeGeneres Show through Skype to talk about her cause to encourage people to be organ donors and give people like her a second chance. According to The Ottawa Sun, registrations for organ donations in Ottawa have skyrocketed by more than 8,000 since December, and the Trillium Gift of Life Network (TLGN) attributes it to the "Helene Campbell effect."

Hélène got the attention of local media vehicles and politicians, such as Lisa MacLeod. She also received a Queen Elizabeth II Diamond Jubilee Medal, awarded by Canadian Prime Minister Stephen Harper in recognition of her work in raising awareness of the importance of organ donation on May 23, 2012.

References

External links
Hélène's blog
A Lung Story Youtube

1991 births
Living people
People from Ottawa
Lung transplant recipients